The 2015 Rostelecom Cup was the fifth event of six in the 2015–16 ISU Grand Prix of Figure Skating, a senior-level international invitational competition series. It was held at the Luzhniki Small Sports Arena in Moscow on November 20–22. Medals were awarded in the disciplines of men's singles, ladies' singles, pair skating, and ice dancing. Skaters earned points toward qualifying for the 2015–16 Grand Prix Final.

Entries

Changes to initial lineup
 On September 14, Adelina Sotnikova, Natalja Zabijako / Alexander Enbert, and Victoria Sinitsina / Nikita Katsalapov were added as a host picks.
 On October 16, Sara Hurtado / Adrià Díaz were removed from the roster. It was announced that the couple had split. On October 26, their replacement was announced as Viktoria Kavaliova / Yurii Bieliaiev.

Results

Men

Ladies

Pairs

Ice dancing

References

External links
 2015 Rostelecom Cup at the International Skating Union
 Starting orders and result details

2015 in figure skating
Rostelecom Cup
2015 in Russian sport
November 2015 sports events in Russia